William Emslie (3 August 1908 – 7 August 1969) was a Scotland international rugby union player.

Rugby Union career

Amateur career

He played for Royal HSFP.

Provincial career

He was capped for Edinburgh District.

International career

He was capped 2 times for Scotland.

References

1908 births
1969 deaths
Scottish rugby union players
Scotland international rugby union players
Royal HSFP players
Edinburgh District (rugby union) players
Rugby union fly-halves